Krikor Zohrab (26 June 1861 – 1915) was an influential Armenian writer, politician, and lawyer from Constantinople (now Istanbul). At the onset of the Armenian genocide he was arrested by the Turkish government and sent to appear before a military court in Diyarbakır. En route, at a locality called Karaköprü or Şeytanderesi on the outskirts of Urfa, he was murdered by a band of known brigands under the leadership of Çerkez Ahmet, Halil and Nazım some time between 15 July and 20 July 1915.

Life 
Zohrab was born into a wealthy family in Beşiktaş, Constantinople on 26 June 1861. His early education was completed at a local Armenian Catholic school. He received a civil engineering degree from Galatasaray Institute, but did not work in that field. Instead, he enrolled in a newly opened law school, the Imperial University of Jurisprudence (today: Istanbul University Faculty of Law), and received his law degree in 1882. Zohrab was a revered lawyer in the courts of the Ottoman Empire. He became a professor at the university, teaching law. At the age of 27, Zohrab married Clara Yazejian, and fathered two daughters and two sons. One of the daughters, Dolores Zohrab Liebmann, eventually became an American philanthropist.

Krikor Zohrab defended successfully many Armenians charged with a variety of political and criminal offenses between 1895-96. As a result of his defense of a Bulgarian revolutionary in the course of which he accused a Turkish official of torture, he was disbarred and forced to live abroad.

In 1908, following the revolution of the Young Turks, Zohrab became a member of parliament in the Ottoman Council, and also served his community as an Armenian councilor.

Personality and lifestyle 
Zohrab was a great intellectual that lived a very busy life. He had to balance his professional life with his personal life. He had a rich personality along with a generous heart. He loved life and its pleasures. Although Zohrab usually was open to progressive ideas he was steadfastly conservative to women's role in society. He believed that women should keep their traditional roles and not venture further.

Political activity 

Ever since he was a teenager, Zohrab showed great interest in national work and contributed heavily to his community. At the age of 30, he was chosen to be part of the national council of Constantinople and served on the council until his death. He was one of the first victims of the Armenian genocide.  

From 1908 onwards, Zohrab was a member of Ottoman Parliament and known for his eloquent speeches. He vehemently defended Armenian interests and rights inside the council and at all levels of the government. In 1909 during the Adana massacre, he strongly criticized the Turkish authorities for their actions and demanded that those responsible be brought to justice.

To serve the Armenian cause, Zohrab wrote an influential paper in French called "La question arménienne à la lumière des documents" (The Armenian question in light of documents), published in 1913 under the pseudonym Marcel Léart in Paris. It dealt with many aspects of the hardships endured by the Armenian populace and denounced the government's inaction.

Publications

Zohrab wrote many articles in Armenian daily newspapers such as Masis (Մասիս), Hairenik (Հայրենիք), and Arevelk (Armenian: Արեւելք). One of his famous articles, entitled "Broom," criticized Armenian nationals and works saying they needed some "sweeping" to bring them back to order.

One of Zohrab's characteristics was that he would regularly express himself in a provocative fashion with disregard to the Turkish state's repressive authority. He had condemned the state on countless occasions for their many shortcomings.

Writing Style 

Zohrab can be said to be the master of the Armenian short story. Despite being influenced by the romantic writers as a youngster, he quickly joined the French realism movement propelled by such writers as Guy de Maupassant, Alphonse Daudet and Émile Zola. He is probably the best Armenian writer of the genre.

Zohrab lived and wrote about what he lived through. He said that writing was an exhilarating activity into which he could delve himself and forget the pains of everyday life. He had a very sharp eye for human characteristics, both physical and psychological. Descriptions of the human persona were one of his stronger points. Zohrab was able to accurately portray faces and gestures in a vivid way. In short, dense, but highly expressive lines, he was able to clearly illustrate a tragedy or a character's qualities.

Arrest and assassination 

During the mass arrests and execution that would signal the start of the Armenian Genocide in and around 24 April 1915, Zohrab was diligently working to try to stop the atrocities. As a member of Parliament, he tried to contact the Turkish authorities and to plea for the immediate cessation of the massacres. He even contacted his supposed friend Talaat Pasha to protest and asked for redress, but to no avail. On the 1 June 1915, he once more demanded explanations for the massacres inflicted on the Armenians in the eastern provinces  from both Talaat and the secretary general of the Committee for Union and Progress (CUP) Mithat Şükrü Bleda and mentioned that one day he would demand an explanation for these actions in the Ottoman Parliament. This would be the last time they would meet. Some integrants within his immediate circle strongly encouraged him to leave the country, but Zohrab refused. 

O the 2 June 1915, Zohrab was arrested by the Turks, Vartkes Serengülian another deputy to the Ottoman Parliament was arrested the same time. Ordered to appear before a court martial in Diyarbakır, they traveled together by train to Aleppo, escorted by one gendarme. They remained in Aleppo for a few weeks, waiting for the results of attempts by the Ottoman governor of the city to have them sent back to the capital. Some sources state that Cemal Pasha himself tried to secure their return, but Talaat Pasha insisted on having the pair court martialed. They were then dispatched to Urfa and remained there for some time in the house of a Turkish deputy friend. Later, they were taken under police escort and taken to Diyarbakır by car. They were murdered by the well-known band of brigands led by Çerkez Ahmet, Halil and Nazım, at a locality called Karaköprü or Şeytanderesi in the outskirts of Urfa, some time between 15 July and 20 July 1915. The murderers were tried and executed in Damascus by Cemal Pasha in September 1915, and the assassinations became the subject of a 1916 investigation by the Ottoman Parliament led by Artin Boshgezenian, the deputy for Aleppo.

Works 
Some of Zohrab's published writings are:
A Vanished Generation (Անհետացած սերունդ մը) is one of his works. Considered a great piece of realist writing.
Familiar Faces (Ծանօթ դէմքեր), a piece where he draws portraits of prominent figures of his time.
From the Journeyman's Diary (Ուղեւորի օրագրէն), a book about European travels and the impressions they left on him.

See also 
Armenian genocide
Deportation of Armenian intellectuals on 24 April 1915

References

External links

Short biography
La Question arménienne à la lumière des documents - National Library of France

Armenian-language writers
1861 births
1915 deaths
Politicians of the Ottoman Empire
People who died in the Armenian genocide
Armenians from the Ottoman Empire
Political people from the Ottoman Empire
Lawyers from the Ottoman Empire
Writers from Istanbul
Galatasaray High School alumni
Istanbul University Faculty of Law alumni
19th-century writers from the Ottoman Empire
20th-century writers from the Ottoman Empire
People from Beşiktaş